Dionne Rose-Henley (7 November 1969 – 24 December 2018) was a Jamaican athlete who specialised in the high hurdles. She competed at the 1992 and 1996 Summer Olympics, finishing fifth at her second Games.

Her personal best times were 12.64 in the 100 meters hurdles (1996) and 7.96 in the indoor 60 meters hurdles (1997). In 2017, she  coached sprinters and hurdlers at Coastal Carolina University.

After retiring from Track and Field she took up coaching. She coached at Middle Tennessee State University where she was a past student.

Rose-Henley died on 24 December 2018 at age 49, after a short battle with cancer.

Competition record

References

1969 births
2018 deaths
Jamaican female hurdlers
Athletes (track and field) at the 1991 Pan American Games
Pan American Games competitors for Jamaica
Athletes (track and field) at the 1994 Commonwealth Games
Commonwealth Games competitors for Jamaica
Athletes (track and field) at the 1992 Summer Olympics
Athletes (track and field) at the 1996 Summer Olympics
Olympic athletes of Jamaica
Central American and Caribbean Games gold medalists for Jamaica
Central American and Caribbean Games bronze medalists for Jamaica
Competitors at the 1998 Central American and Caribbean Games
Competitors at the 2002 Central American and Caribbean Games
Middle Tennessee Blue Raiders women's track and field athletes
Middle Tennessee Blue Raiders track and field coaches
Coastal Carolina Chanticleers track and field coaches
Central American and Caribbean Games medalists in athletics
Competitors at the 2001 Goodwill Games
20th-century Jamaican women
21st-century Jamaican women